Cotinis ibarrai is a species of the Cotinis scarab subgenus Liberocera.

References

Cetoniinae
Beetles of North America
Beetles described in 1988